Robert Mascall Curteis (12 October 1851 – 21 January 1927) was an English cricketer. Curteis was a right-handed batsman. He was born at Hailsham, Sussex, and was educated at Westminster School.

Curteis made his first-class debut for Sussex against Kent in 1873 at Ashford, Eastbourne. His next appearance for Sussex in first-class cricket came against Gloucestershire in 1873, with Curteis making seven further first-class appearances for the county, the last of which came against the Marylebone Cricket Club in 1878. In his nine first-class matches for Sussex, he scored a total of 101 runs at an average of 7.21, with a high score of 41. He also made two first-class appearances for the Marylebone Cricket Club, both against Hampshire in 1880 and 1881.

He died at the town of his birth on 28 October 1919. His father, Herbert, Sr., played first-class cricket, as did his brother Herbert, Jr.

References

External links
Robert Curteis at ESPNcricinfo
Robert Curteis at CricketArchive

1851 births
1927 deaths
People from Hailsham
People educated at Westminster School, London
English cricketers
Sussex cricketers
Marylebone Cricket Club cricketers